There have been a great number of anamorphic format trade names, for reasons of prestige, technology, or vanity. The basic 35 mm anamorphic format originally popularized as CinemaScope has been known by a number of other monikers. In some cases, these names actually refer to different lens designs and technologies implemented; however, the great majority are simply re-branded lenses originally known by another name. In recent decades, it has generally been considered a cliché throwback, and thus the generic name of anamorphic format has become predominant.

All of the following trade names refer to the modern SMPTE-standard anamorphic 35 mm format or what was regarded as the standard at that time. Generically speaking, this means a 2× anamorphosis lens with 4-perf negative pulldown for both image origination and projection, and an aspect ratio of 2.35:1 until 1970 (requiring special, narrow "negative assembly" splices) and 2.39:1 after 1970 (using conventional "negative assembly" splices). The change from 2.35:1 to 2.39:1 (sometimes rounded to 2.4:1 or, mathematically incorrectly, to 2.40:1) was mainly intended to facilitate "negative assembly", and also to better hide "negative assembly" splices, which otherwise may appear as a slight "flash" at the upper edge of the frame, during a splice. The term anamorphic should not be considered synonymous with widescreen; VistaVision was non-anamorphic, and at the time of shooting, so was Techniscope
.

Trade names
 /i Scope (from Cooke Anamorphic/i Lenses) (England)
 AgaScope (Sweden, Czechoslovakia and Hungary)
 Alexcope, also known as AlexScope (Argentina)
 Arriscope (Germany; developed by Arri)
 ArriVision (Germany; 3-D)
 Autentiscope (Spain)
 Camerascope (England)
 Cathayscope (Hong Kong)
 Cinepanoramic (France)
 CinemaScope (USA ["Bausch & Lomb formula" anamorphics, used for the fourth and all subsequent CinemaScope films]/France ["Chrétien formula" anamorphic, used for only the first three CinemaScope films]; pre-releases were 2.66:1, with separate 3-track sound, and 2.55:1, with composite 4-track sound, before standardization on 2.35:1; all general releases were 2.55:1, 1953 and later or 2.35:1, 1958 and later; the camera aperture remained 1.33:1/2.66:1; only the recommended projection aperture changed)
 Cinescope (Italy)
 Cineovision (Japan)
 Clairmont-Scope (USA)
 Colorscope (Italy; inconsistent usage across different formats, including anamorphic)
 Daieiscope (Japan)
 Dyaliscope (France)
 Elite Scope (Russia)
 Euroscope (France)
 Filmascope (Spain)
 Filmscope (Spain)
 Franscope (France and Czechoslovakia until 1959)
 Grandscope (Japan)
 Hammerscope (England)
 Hawk Scope (Germany)
 Hispanoscope a.k.a. Ifiscope (Spain)
 J-D-C Scope (England; developed by Joe Dunton)
 Kinoscope (Spain)
 Kowa Scope (Japan)
 Lomoscope (Russia)
 Magnoscope a.k.a. Cinescope (Spain)
 Master Scope (from Zeiss Master Anamorphic Lenses) (Germany)
 Megascope (England)
 Merdekascope (Malaysia)
 Naturama (USA)
 Nikkatsu Scope (Japan)
 Nipponscope (Japan)
 Optex-Scope (England)
 Panamorph (US)
 Panavision (US)
 Panoramic(a) (Italy)
 Perfimascope (Malaysia)
 Regalscope (US; 20th Century Fox's trade name for CinemaScope when used on black and white films)
 Rapiscope (Indonesia)
 Ruralscope {Made by Totalvision} (France)
 Scanoscope (several Hollywood productions in 1950s–60s were shot with this system, as the system was sold, not licensed; camera and optical printer lenses were made)
 Shawscope (Hong Kong; Shaw Brothers's trade name for CinemaScope)
 SIRUI Optical GmbH (Germany)
 Sovscope (USSR)
 Space-Vision (3-D)
 Spectrascope
 SuperCinescope (Italy),
 Superscope (1954)
 SuperTotalscope (Italy)
 Technirama (1956)
 Techniscope (Italy)
 Technovision (France)
 Todd-AO 35 (US)
 Toeiscope (Japan)
 TohoScope (Japan)
 Totalscope (Italy)
 Totalvision (France)
 Ultrascope (Germany)
 Vídeoscope (Spain)
 Vistarama
 WarnerScope (US; developed by Warner Bros.)
 Warwickscope (England)

References

Film and video terminology
Anamorphic format